Delay Namgyal Barfungpa (Delay Kazi Barfungpa) is an Indian politician.

Political career
Delay Namgyal Barfungpa was former member of the Sikkim Pradesh Congress Committee (SPCC. Sikkim branch of Indian National Congress) which was led by Nar Bahadur Bhandari. Barfungpa contested the Sikkim Legislative seat from Rumtek Constituency, but he was defeated by the candidate of the ruling party Sikkim Democratic Front (SDF). After this election, he seceded from SPCC at some point from 2004 to 2008.

On 10 October 2008, Delay Namgyal Barfungpa joined Sikkim National People’s Party (SNPP), which was established by Biraj Adhikari (former general secretary of SPCC and spokesperson of Sikkim Himali Rajya Parishad (SHRP)) for fighting with SDF. Barfungpa was appointed to the treasurer of SNPP. In 2009 Sikkim Legislative Assembly election, Barfungpa changed his constituency from Rumtek to Gangtok. But SNPP had not been able to be registered in the List of Political Parties of Election Commission of India (ECI). Barfungpa had to run as an independent candidate, and lost by less than 3% votes.

Delay Namgyal Barfungpa was promoted to the vice president of SNPP at some point from 2009 to 2012. In December 2012 Barfungpa petitioned the Supreme Court with corruption allegations against the SDF Government. In August 2018 Adhikari resigned from the president and seceded from SNPP. Barfungpa didn't follow Adhikari, and Barfungpa was elected to the SNPP president by party members.

In 2019 Sikkim Legislative Assembly election, SNPP had not been able to be registered in the List of Political Parties of ECI before election period, Delay Namgyal Barfungpa and other 2 SNPP candidates had to run as an independent candidates, again. Barfungpa lost and received only 1.31% in Gangtok constituency.

In the By-Election of Sikkim Legislative Assembly 2019 (3 constituencies), Delay Namgyal Barfungpa was planning to contest from Gangtok constituency as an independent candidate third times. Before this By-Election, the candidate of Hamro Sikkim Party (HSP) from Gangtok constituency, Bhaichung Bhutia proposed a pre-poll alliance to Barfungpa, but Barfungpa didn't accept it.

Just as that time, SNPP had finally been registered to the List of the Political Parties of ECI as the State Party (Unrecognized) on 25 September 2019. As the result, this was the first and final election that Delay Namgyal Barfungpa could contest as the candidate of SNPP.

In this By-Election from Gangtok constituency, the candidate of Bharatiya Janata Party (BJP), Yong Tshering Lepcha elected by 2,508 (40.88%) votes. At the same time, Delay Namgyal Barfungpa became a runner-up candidate by 1,498 (24.42%) votes, and he could refund his deposit of candidacy.

Delay Namgyal Barfungpa is a candidate with the 2nd highest declared assets (Rs 57,79,62,986), contested in Sikkim Legislative Assembly Election 2019.

In March 2022, Delay Namgyal Barfungpa announced the SNPP's merger with Sikkim Krantikari Morcha (SKM). Barfungpa along with SNPP executive members and party supporters also joined SKM.

Electoral record 
 Sikkim Legislative Assembly election

References

Living people
Sikkim politicians
People from Gangtok district
Indian National Congress politicians from Sikkim
Year of birth missing (living people)